"Brains Out" is a single of the Swedish-Greek-Guadeloupe singer songwriter Kim Cesarion. The single was released as the second single from his debut studio album in Sweden on 6 September 2013. The song peaked at number 30 on the Danish Singles Chart. "Brains Out" was written by Kim Cesarion, Arnthor Birgisson, Gary Clark, and Lukasz Duchnowski, and it was produced by Birgisson with co-production handled by Clark.

Track listing

Chart performance

Weekly charts

Release history

References

2013 singles
2013 songs
Songs written by Arnthor Birgisson
Songs written by Gary Clark (musician)